The canton of Chalindrey is an administrative division of the Haute-Marne department, northeastern France. It was created at the French canton reorganisation which came into effect in March 2015. Its seat is in Chalindrey.

It consists of the following communes:
 
Anrosey
Arbigny-sous-Varennes
Belmont
Bize
Champsevraine
Celsoy
Chalindrey
Champigny-sous-Varennes
Chaudenay
Chézeaux
Coiffy-le-Bas
Culmont
Farincourt
Fayl-Billot
Genevrières
Gilley
Grandchamp
Grenant
Guyonvelle
Haute-Amance
Heuilley-le-Grand
Laferté-sur-Amance
Les Loges
Maizières-sur-Amance
Noidant-Chatenoy
Le Pailly
Palaiseul
Pierremont-sur-Amance
Pisseloup
Poinson-lès-Fayl
Pressigny
Rivières-le-Bois
Rougeux
Saint-Broingt-le-Bois
Saint-Vallier-sur-Marne
Saulles
Savigny
Soyers
Torcenay
Tornay
Valleroy
Varennes-sur-Amance
Velles
Violot
Voncourt

References

Cantons of Haute-Marne